La'Donte Harris (born August 13, 1986) is a former wide receiver for Clemson. He has served as the wide receiver & tight end coach for North Greenville University and Gardner–Webb University. He is currently the wide receiver coach & co-recruiting coordinator for the Mercer Bears.

High school career
Harris attended Litchfield High School in Gadsden, Alabama, where he was an All-Southeast pick by PrepStar, runner-up selection as the AAA Back-of-the-Year in Alabama, all-state and all-county in his senior season as a team captain for coach Danny Kimble at Litchfield High School. He was a four-year starter in football, while playing quarterback, wide receiver, tailback, and defensive back. Also, he was a three-year starter in basketball,  averaging 17 points per game during his senior season. He was a top 100 player at his position as well as the first Tiger signee from Alabama since Steve Derriso in 1989., in the 2004 recruiting class.

College career
As a freshman in 2004, Harris was one of only two true freshman that played in all 11 games in that season. He played 137 plays in 11 games and had three catches for 21 yards and had one catch in three different games (Texas A&M, University of Maryland and N.C. State). He also played 31 snaps against Utah State, 26 snaps against Maryland and 20 against N.C. State. He had a season-long 12-yard catch against N.C. State. Going into his sophomore season, he moved to first-team wide receiver on the depth chart. He made his first career start against Colorado in the Champs Sports Bowl where he had an eight-yard reception in 22 snaps. He averaged 22.5 snaps per game at wide receiver and had six catches, but one was a 16-yard touchdown catch against Temple from Will Proctor. He recorded one reception in six different games while playing at least 13 snaps in all 12 games. As a junior, he had three catches for 14 yards while playing in 12 of the 13 games at wide receiver, including three snaps against Kentucky in the Music City Bowl. He played 34 snaps at Boston College and had a reception for six yards and a three-yard catch at Wake Forest. During his senior year, he started three games and recorded 12 catches for 136 and 1 touchdown. He also returned a punt for a touchdown against the University of South Carolina. Even though he was not named a permanent captain for the 2007 season, he was considered a captain by his team members.

Coaching career
Harris is in his first season as an assistant coach at Gardner–Webb, and will coach the team's receivers and tight ends. Harris spent the 2012 season at North Greenville University, where he served in the same role he will have in Boiling Springs. The Crusaders won five of their final six games, with four wins over members of the South Atlantic Conference, and Harris’ receivers played a big role in the team's late success. Receivers Freddie Martino and Taylor Malphrus each had 40-plus yard touchdown receptions in wins over Wingate and Brevard, respectively, and Malphrus had a pair of scoring runs in wins over Newberry and Wingate. Martino caught a team-high 49 passes on the season and Malphrus accounted for six touchdowns – including five on the ground.

Prior to his arrival in Tigerville, South Carolina, Harris spent the 2011 campaign on the player development staff at Clemson under longtime strength & conditioning coach Joey Batson. Harris worked with the Tigers’ offense from a strength and conditioning standpoint, and his time paid off – as Clemson experienced outstanding success. The Tigers earned a berth in the ACC Championship Game and, following a dominant, 38-10 win over Virginia Tech, had the program's first ACC crown since 1991 and an automatic berth in the Orange Bowl – the school's first such berth since the Bowl Championship Series (BCS) inception. It was the Tigers’ first major bowl appearance since the historic 1982 Orange Bowl. The Tigers finished ranked No. 22 in both major polls and defeated four top-25 opponents over the course of the season. The offense compiled 6,171 total yards and passed for 33 touchdowns in Chad Morris’ high-octane system. Clemson finished the season ranked in the top-25 nationally in passing offense (No. 21), scoring offense (No. 24) in final NCAA team statistics, and saw quarterback Tajh Boyd finish ranked No. 18 individually in total offense per game (289.0 ypg). Receiver Sammy Watkins ranked No. 16 in receiving yards per game and ranked No. 4 nationally in all-purpose yardage.

Harris served as a graduate assistant with the Tigers’ offense in 2009 and 2010, working with receivers. Speedster Jacoby Ford went on to be drafted in the fourth round by the Oakland Raiders. Aaron Kelly signed a free agent contract with the Atlanta Falcons. The Tigers finished with a 9-5 record (9-2 ACC) and a No. 24 ranking in 2009 after winning the Music City Bowl under first-year head coach Dabo Swinney. Harris was a student assistant with the Tigers in 2008, helping Clemson to a 7-6 record and a 31-14 win over rival South Carolina in the regular season finale. The 2008 Tigers played Nebraska in the 2009 Gator Bowl, falling 26-21 in a tight contest.

References

Living people
1986 births
Sportspeople from Gadsden, Alabama
American football wide receivers
Clemson Tigers football players